Kihara Maina is a businessman and bank executive in Kenya. He is the Regional Chief Executive Officer at I&M Bank Group, an East African financial services conglomerate, active in Kenya, Tanzania, Rwanda, Uganda and Mauritius. He is based in Nairobi.

He took up his current position in 2023, while Gul Khan replaced him as I&M Bank Kenya, CEO. For the seven years before that, Kihara was the CEO and managing director of Barclays Bank Tanzania, based in Dar es Salaam.

Background and education
He was born in Kenya circa 1969. After attending primary school locally, he enrolled in Alliance High School (Kenya), an all-boys middle and high school, located in Kikuyu, Kiambu County, Kenya. He graduated in 1987 with a High School Diploma in Mathematics, Physics and Chemistry.

His first degree, a Bachelor of Science in Mathematics and Statistics, was obtained from Moi University near Eldoret, Uasin Gishu County in 1991. His second degree, a Master of Business Administration, was awarded in 2009, by the University of Chicago Booth School of Business, in Chicago, Illinois, United States.

Career
In 1993, Kihara was hired by Stanbic Bank Kenya Limited, today part of Stanbic Holdings Plc. Later he transferred to Barclays Bank of Kenya, today Absa Bank Kenya Plc. He served in various roles, rising to Head of Trading at the bank in 2001. In 2004 he was promoted to Regional Treasurer, East Africa, responsible for treasury functions at Barclays subsidiaries in Kenya, Tanzania and Uganda. In 2009, he was again promoted to managing director and chief executive officer of Barclays Bank of Tanzania, serving there until 2016. In May 2016, he was appointed as the CEO of I&M Bank Kenya.

Other considerations
Kihara is a married father of two children, one son and one daughter.

See also
I&M Holdings Limited
List of banks in Kenya

References

External links
 I&M Bank Kenya Homepage
 I&M Bank opens two new branches as clients increase As of 2 June 2016.

Living people
1969 births
Kenyan businesspeople
Kikuyu people
Kenyan business executives
Kenyan bankers
Kenyan chief executives
Moi University alumni
University of Chicago alumni
People from Kiambu County
Alumni of Alliance High School (Kenya)